The Old Logan County Courthouse on Main St. in Russell Springs, Kansas was built in 1887.  It was designed by Alfred Meyer and built by local contractor George D. Kerns.  It was listed on the National Register of Historic Places in 1972.

Butterfield Trail Museum
The building is now home to the Butterfield Trail Museum. Exhibits focus on area pioneers, local history and natural history of the Great Plains, and the history of the Butterfield Overland Despatch stage line. The museum is open seasonally.

References

External links
 Butterfield Trail Museum - official site

Courthouses on the National Register of Historic Places in Kansas
Renaissance Revival architecture in Kansas
Government buildings completed in 1887
Buildings and structures in Logan County, Kansas
County courthouses in Kansas
Museums in Logan County, Kansas
History museums in Kansas
National Register of Historic Places in Logan County, Kansas
1887 establishments in Kansas